The 2012 Utah gubernatorial election was held on November 6, 2012. It was won by Republican incumbent Governor Gary Herbert.

Republican nomination

Candidates
 Gary Herbert, incumbent governor

Defeated at convention
 David Kirkham, businessman and co-founder of the Utah tea party
 Morgan Philpot, former state representative and nominee for the U.S. House of Representatives in 2010
 Lane Ronnow
 William Skokos, energy entrepreneur and CEO of Standard American Oil Company
 Ken Sumsion, state representative

Declined
 Stephen Sandstrom, state representative
 Mark Shurtleff, state attorney general

Polling

Convention results

Democratic nomination

Candidate
 Peter Cooke, businessman and retired major general in the United States Army Reserve

Declined
 Jim Matheson, U.S. representative

General election

Candidates
 Gary Herbert (Republican), incumbent governor
Running mate: Greg Bell, incumbent lieutenant governor
 Peter Cooke (Democratic), businessman and retired major general in the United States Army Reserve
Running mate: Vincent Rampton, attorney and son of former Governor Cal Rampton
Kirk D Pearson (Constitution)
Running mate: Tim Aalders
Ken Larsen (Libertarian), medical researcher 
Running mate: Robert Latham, attorney

Debates
Complete video of debate, October 11, 2012 - C-SPAN

Predictions

Polling

Results

References

External links
 Utah Government Services – Elections

Official campaign sites (Archived)
 Peter Cooke for Governor
 Gary Herbert for Governor

2012
Utah
Gubernatorial